"Candles" is a song recorded by American pop punk band Hey Monday. The song was first included on the group's debut album, Hold On Tight (2008). While working on their scrapped second studio album, the band re-recorded the song; this new version was released on February 8, 2011 as the Candles EP, along with an acoustic demo of the song and a previously-unreleased song called "The One That Got Away". A music video for the song debuted March 9, 2011 on Just Jared. "Candles" was the last single released by the group before they went on hiatus for Cassadee Pope to pursue her solo career.

Track listing

Credits and personnel
 Cassadee Pope – writer, lead vocals
 Mike Gentile – guitar
 Alex Lipshaw – guitar
 Michael "Jersey" Moriarty – bass
 Elliot James – drums
 Will Pugh – background vocals
 Clifford Carter – piano
 Rob Mathes - strings

Chart performance

Glee version

The cast of Glee covered the song in their second season episode, "Original Song". In the episode, Blaine Anderson (Darren Criss) and Kurt Hummel (Chris Colfer) performed "Candles" as a duet as part of The Warblers' setlist for Regionals. As with almost every song performed on the show, the Glee cover was released as a digital single, on March 15, 2011. It is also included on the soundtrack album Glee: The Music Presents the Warblers. The Glee version proved to be more commercially successful than the original, charting in Australia, Canada, The United Kingdom, and The United States.

Chart performance

References

2011 singles
2011 songs
Hey Monday songs
Columbia Records singles
Song recordings produced by S*A*M and Sluggo
Songs written by Sam Hollander
Songs written by Dave Katz
Songs written by Cassadee Pope